The División de Honor de Béisbol 2018 was the 33rd season of the top Spanish baseball league since its establishment and the 73rd Spanish championship overall.

Tenerife Marlins achieved their tenth title.

Teams
Miralbueno made their debut in the División de Honor.

League table

References

External links
Spanish Baseball and Softball Federation website

División de Honor de Béisbol